is the 17th studio album by Japanese entertainer Miho Nakayama. Released through King Records on September 30, 1995, it features the single "Hurt to Heart (Itami no Yukue)". Like her previous studio releases Mellow, Wagamama na Actress, and Pure White, the ballad-oriented Mid Blue was self-produced and recorded in Los Angeles.

The album peaked at No. 7 on Oricon's albums chart and sold over 145,000 copies.

Track listing

Personnel
 Miho Nakayama – vocals
 Jai Winding – keyboards
 Tom Keane – keyboards
 Yoko Kanno – piano
 Joe Sample – piano (8)
 Michael Landau – guitar
 James Harrah – guitar
 Curt Bisquera – drums
 Luis Conte – percussion
 Jerry Hey – flugelhorn
 Dan Higgins – flute
 Jimmy Z – harmonica
 Dwayne Benjamin – horns
 Rastine Calhoun II – horns
 Andy Cleaves – horns
 Hajime Mizoguchi – cello
 Shinozaki Masatsugu Quartet – strings
 Kenny Harris – backing vocals (3, 8)
 Priscilla – backing vocals (2)
 Olivia – backing vocals (2)
 Vivien Watson – backing vocals (2)
 Laura Watson – backing vocals (2)
 Kana Matsumoto – backing vocals (2)
 Lisa Kiff – backing vocals (2)
 Natalie Cowan-Birch – backing vocals (2)
 Cindy – backing vocals (10)
 Maria – backing vocals (10)

Charts

References

External links
 
 
 

1995 albums
Miho Nakayama albums
Japanese-language albums
King Records (Japan) albums